Islamic School of Trenton is a private Islamic School that serves students from pre-kindergarten to ninth grade. The school is located in Trenton in Mercer County, New Jersey, United States.

History

The Islamic School of Trenton was established as the I.M.B.I. Day School in September, 2001, as a service for families in the Trenton community with Pre-Kindergarten and Kindergarten aged children. One grade has been added every year. The students are taught all academic subjects in accordance with state guidelines, along with Islamic studies, Arabic language, reading and memorizing Qur'an.

Hifz School
The school has a Quran hifz program, where students are served in memorizing the Quran.

References

External links

2001 establishments in New Jersey
Educational institutions established in 2001
Private K–8 schools in New Jersey
Islamic schools in New Jersey
Private schools in Mercer County, New Jersey
Buildings and structures in Trenton, New Jersey